{{DISPLAYTITLE:C10H8O}}
C10H8O may refer to:

 Naphthols
 1-Naphthol
 2-Naphthol
 Benzoxepins
 1-Benzoxepin
 2-Benzoxepin
 3-Benzoxepin
 Hydroxyazulenes
 1-Hydroxyazulene
 2-Hydroxyazulene
 4-Hydroxyazulene
 5-Hydroxyazulene
 6-Hydroxyazulene
 Phenylfurans
 2-Phenylfuran
 3-Phenylfuran